Žarko Dolinar (3 July 1920 – 9 March 2003), Ph.D., was a biologist and table tennis player who won eight medals at the World Table Tennis Championships.

He was born in a family of Slovene economic immigrants to Croatia. In 1939, at the age of 18 he became the national champion of Yugoslavia. Dolinar was champion of the Independent State of Croatia multiple times, and also competed for its national team on nine occasions.

He also won three English Open titles.

Dolinar is the only world sporting champion with a Ph.D. degree. He graduated from the University of Zagreb Faculty of Veterinary Medicine in 1949, and received a doctorate in 1959. He was world doubles champion with his partner, Vilim Harangozo. Dolinar was also head of the Sports Science Committee for the International Table Tennis Federation (ITTF).

A university professor in both Zagreb and Basel, Dolinar and his brother Boris were honored as the Righteous Among the Nations for saving Jews during World War II. On a number of occasions, the Dolinar brothers provided Jews with forged identity documents and travel permits, used their connections to have them released from imprisonment, and helped them travel to safety.

In 2016, Dolinar was inducted into the European Table Tennis Hall of Fame.

See also
 List of table tennis players
 List of World Table Tennis Championships medalists

References

External links

ŽIVLJENJEPISI SLOVENCEV V HRVAŠKEM ŠPORTU. slovenci-zagreb.hr (2014). pp. 119–122
 About Žarko Dolinar on Yad Vashem's Website
 "Tribute to Žarko Dolinar", STK Industrogradnja (in Croatian)

1920 births
2003 deaths
People from Koprivnica
Croatian people of Slovenian descent
Croatian male table tennis players
Croatian Righteous Among the Nations
Croatian biologists
Croatian expatriate sportspeople in Switzerland
Faculty of Veterinary Medicine, University of Zagreb alumni
Academic staff of the University of Zagreb
Academic staff of the University of Basel
Burials at Mirogoj Cemetery
Sportspeople from Koprivnica
World Table Tennis Championships medalists
Yugoslav biologists
Yugoslav academics